Otanada was a town of ancient Cilicia, inhabited in Byzantine times. The name does not occur among ancient authors but is inferred from epigraphic and other evidence.

Its site is located near Hotamışalanı, Asiatic Turkey.

References

Populated places in ancient Cilicia
Former populated places in Turkey
Populated places of the Byzantine Empire
History of Mersin Province